The Fisher Hill Reservoir and Gatehouse are historic elements of the public water supply for the Greater Boston area.

History
The reservoir was located on Fisher Avenue between Hyslop and Channing Roads in Brookline, Massachusetts, and is now the site of Fisher Hill Reservoir Park.  It was built in 1886-87 as an early component of the Boston Water Board's expansion of its high service system. The gatehouse may have been designed by Arthur Vinal, who also designed the Chestnut Hill pumping station at the Chestnut Hill Reservoir.

It is a two-story Richardsonian Romanesque structure, with its first floor finished in stone and its second in brick. Brownstone trim is used on the windows and corner quoins, and the voussoirs which form the arches on the first floor.  There are pipes to the reservoir and down to Chestnut Hill, and gates for controlling access to local the distribution network. The building was taken out of service in the 1950s.

The reservoir and gatehouse were listed on the National Register of Historic Places in 1990.  In 2013, the town acquired the property from the state, and has since converted it into a public park, filling in the reservoir.  The gatehouse survives, and there is interpretive signage explaining the historical use of the property.

See also
National Register of Historic Places listings in Brookline, Massachusetts

References

External links

Water supply infrastructure on the National Register of Historic Places
Industrial buildings and structures on the National Register of Historic Places in Massachusetts
Infrastructure completed in 1887
Buildings and structures in Brookline, Massachusetts
Reservoirs in Massachusetts
Gatehouses (waterworks)
Historic American Engineering Record in Massachusetts
National Register of Historic Places in Brookline, Massachusetts
Historic district contributing properties in Massachusetts
Lakes of Norfolk County, Massachusetts
1887 establishments in Massachusetts